AJK may refer to:

 Azad Jammu and Kashmir, or Azad Kashmir, part of Kashmir administered by Pakistan
 AJK TV, a Kashmiri-language channel for Azad Kashmir
 A.J.K. Mass Communication Research Centre, a research centre in New Delhi
 Arak Airport, Iran (by IATA airport code)